Kaniasso Department is a department of Folon Region in Denguélé District, Ivory Coast. In 2021, its population was 84,572 and its seat is the settlement of Kaniasso. The sub-prefectures of the department are Goulia, Kaniasso and Mahandiana-Sokourani.

History
Kaniasso Department was created in 2011 as part of the restructuring of the subdivisions of Ivory Coast, when departments were converted from the second-level administrative subdivisions of the country to the third-level subdivisions. It was created by splitting Minignan Department.

Notes

States and territories established in 2011
2011 establishments in Ivory Coast
Departments of Folon Region